Prochoreutis pseudostellaris is a moth of the family Choreutidae. It is known from the Crimea and Turkey.

The wingspan is 12-13.5 mm.

References

Prochoreutis